Christopher Naliali (born 8 March 1992) is an Ivorian naturalized French sprinter who specializes in the 100 and 200 metres.

In his main event, the 200 metres, he reached the semi-final of the 2014 African Championships and the 2016 African Championships (in the latter event he also reached the semi of the 100 metres. He was knocked out in the heats at the 2017 Summer Universiade.

As a part of the Ivorian 4 × 100 metres relay team he won a gold medal at the 2015 African Games and a silver medal (as a heats-only competitor) at the 2016 African Championships.

His personal best times are 6.68 seconds in the 60 metres (indoor), achieved in February 2016 in Aubière; 10.36 seconds in the 100 metres, achieved in June 2016 in Argentan; and 20.76 seconds in the 200 metres, achieved in June 2017 in New York City.

References

1992 births
Living people
French male sprinters
Ivorian male sprinters
Ivorian emigrants to France
African Games gold medalists for Ivory Coast
African Games medalists in athletics (track and field)
Athletes (track and field) at the 2015 African Games
French Athletics Championships winners
Competitors at the 2017 Summer Universiade